Thandavarayar was born in Villipakkam near Chennai. He was a Tamil enthusiast and worked as a judge.

Education and missions 
He studied Tamil from Uzhalur Velappa Desikar, Varathappa Mudaliar, and Vaduganatha Thambiran. He has studied English, Telugu, Kannada, Hindustani, Marathi & Sanskrit. He learned Tamil grammar from Mahavithuvan Ramanuja Kavirayar and Saravana Perumalayar. He has been the leading Tamil poet of the Chennai Education Society. In 1843 he served as a judge in the Chengalpattu Court. He was the Pioneer of developing wealth of vocabulary in political matters.

Works 
Thandavaraya translated the Panchatanra from the Maharastrian version, instead of Sanskrit to Tamil.

 Ilakkana Vinaa Vidai
 Kathamanjari
 Tiruttaṇikaimālai
 Tiruppōrūrpatikam
 Panchatantra Kadhai (Translation)

Published texts 
The first three volumes of the Sathura agarathi, composed by Veeramamuni, were printed and published in 1824. In 1835, Thandavara published the book Grammar Panchakam (Epistle, Intrinsic, and Extrinsic Venpamalai).and printed the first ten parts of Soodamani Nigandu. He also printed and published the first eight parts of the Chendhar Thivakaram.

Death 
He died in 1850.

References

Other sources 
 Mayilai Seeni. Venkatasami (2001). Tamil literature in the nineteenth century. Meyyappaṉ tamiḻāyvakam.
 Ramasamy Pulavar, 'Tamil Puluvar series' Thandavaraya Mudaliar.

Tamil scholars
Tamil writers
Tamil publishers (people)
Indian translators